Oppanda is a 2022 Indian Kannada-language crime action film written and directed by S.S.Sameer, making his debut. It features Arjun Sarja and Radhika Kumaraswamy along with J.D.Chakravarthy in the lead roles. The supporting cast includes Sony Charista and Bollywood actor Faisal Khan, making his Kannada debut. The score and soundtrack for the film is by Subhash Anand and the cinematography is by Amma Rajashekhar and the editing is done by Prabhu. The film was planned to be simultaneously released in Tamil as Iruvar Oppantham and in Telugu as Iddaru.

Cast 

 Arjun Sarja as Sanjay Rangaswamy
 Radhika Kumaraswamy as Anjali
 J.D. Chakravarthy as Chakri
 K. Vishwanath as Rangaswamy
 SS Sameer
 Faisal Khan
 Sony Charista

Production and release 
The film was announced in May 2017 under the title Contract. The filming began around September 2017. The film was wrapped before the pandemic by around March 2018. The film first had Arjun Sarja on board as the male lead. Radhika Kumaraswamy was cast later for the female lead character. The film later had JD Chakravarthy on board to play another lead character. The film was shot in Bengaluru, Mysuru, Hyderabad, and Bangkok. The 1st trailer of the film was released on 9 April 2021 and the second trailer was released on 15 October 2021. The release of the film got delayed multiple times and film the film was released on 11 February 2022. The film underwent a change in the title from Contract to Oppanda.

Soundtrack 

The film's background score and the soundtracks are composed by Subhash Anand. The music rights were acquired by F Series Audio.

References

External links 

 

2020s Kannada-language films
2022 crime action films
Indian crime action films
2022 directorial debut films
Films shot in Mysore
Films shot in Bangalore
Romantic crime films